Ladon (Ancient Greek: Λάδων; gen.: Λάδωνος Ladonos) was a monster in Greek mythology, the dragon that guarded the golden apples in the Garden of the Hesperides.

Family 
According to Hesiod's Theogony, Ladon was the last of the progeny of Phorcys and Ceto. A scholion on Apollonius of Rhodes' Argonautica, however, cites Hesiod as calling him the son of Typhon, and the same scholion on Apollonius of Rhodes claims that one "Peisandros" called Ladon born of the earth. The mythographer Apollodorus calls Ladon the offspring of the monstrous Typhon and Echidna, a parentage repeated by Hyginus and Pherecydes; similarly, Ladon is called the son of Typhon in Tzetzes' Chiliades.

According to Ptolemy Hephaestion's New History, as recorded by Photius in his Bibliotheca, Ladon was the brother of the Nemean lion.

Mythology 
Ladon was the serpent-like dragon that twined and twisted around the tree in the Garden of the Hesperides and guarded the golden apples. In pursuance of his eleventh labour, Heracles killed Ladon with a bow and arrow and carried the apples away. The following day, Jason and the Argonauts passed by on their chthonic return journey from Colchis, hearing the lament of "shining" Aegle, one of the four Hesperides, and viewing the still-twitching Ladon. In an alternate version of the myth, Ladon is never slain, and Heracles instead gets the Titan god Atlas to retrieve the apples. At the same time, Heracles takes Atlas’ place, holding up the sky.

The dragon (Ladon) image coiled around the tree, originally adopted by the Hellenes from Near Eastern and Minoan sources, is familiar from surviving Greek vase-painting. In the 2nd century CE, Pausanias saw among the treasuries at Olympia an archaic cult image in cedar-wood of Heracles and the apple-tree of the Hesperides with the snake coiled around it.

Diodorus Siculus gives an euhemerist interpretation of Ladon, as a human shepherd guarding a flock of golden-fleeced sheep, adding, "But with regards to such matters it will be every man's privilege to form such opinions as accord with his own belief."

According to the Astronomy attributed to Hyginus, Ladon is the constellation Draco which was placed among the stars by Zeus. Ladon is the Greek version of the West Semitic serpent Lotan, or the Hurrian serpent Illuyanka. He might be given multiple heads, a hundred in Aristophanes' The Frogs (a passing remark in line 475), which might speak with different voices.

See also
 Lernaean Hydra, a similar monster who was also slain by Heracles.

Notes

References 

 Apollodorus, Apollodorus, The Library, with an English Translation by Sir James George Frazer, F.B.A., F.R.S. in 2 Volumes. Cambridge, Massachusetts, Harvard University Press; London, William Heinemann Ltd. 1921. . Online version at the Perseus Digital Library.
 Apollonius of Rhodes, Apollonius Rhodius: the Argonautica, translated by Robert Cooper Seaton, W. Heinemann, 1912. Internet Archive.
 Diodorus Siculus, Diodorus Siculus: The Library of History. translated by C. H. Oldfather, twelve volumes, Loeb Classical Library, Cambridge, Massachusetts: Harvard University Press; London: William Heinemann, Ltd. 1989. Online version by Bill Thayer.
 Fowler, R. L. (2000), Early Greek Mythography: Volume 1: Text and Introduction, Oxford University Press, 2000. . Google Books.
 Hard, Robin, The Routledge Handbook of Greek Mythology: Based on H.J. Rose's "Handbook of Greek Mythology", Psychology Press, 2004. . Google Books.
 Harry, René, Photius: Bibliothèque. Tome III: Codices 186-222, Collection Budé, Paris, Les Belles Lettres, 1962. .
 Hesiod, Theogony, in Hesiod, Theogony, Works and Days, Testimonia, edited and translated by Glenn W. Most, Loeb Classical Library No. 57, Cambridge, Massachusetts, Harvard University Press, 2018. . Online version at Harvard University Press.
Hyginus, Gaius Julius, De Astronomica, in The Myths of Hyginus, edited and translated by Mary A. Grant, Lawrence: University of Kansas Press, 1960. Online version at ToposText.
 Hyginus, Gaius Julius, Fabulae, in Apollodorus' Library and Hyginus' Fabulae: Two Handbooks of Greek Mythology, translated, with Introductions by R. Scott Smith and Stephen M. Trzaskoma, Hackett Publishing, 2007. . Google Books.
 Merkelbach, R., and M. L. West, Fragmenta Hesiodea, Clarendon Press Oxford, 1967. .
 Ogden, Daniel, Drakōn: Dragon Myth and Serpent Cult in the Greek and Roman Worlds, Oxford University Press, 2013. . Google Books.
Pausanias, Pausanias Description of Greece with an English Translation by W.H.S. Jones, Litt.D., and H.A. Ormerod, M.A., in 4 Volumes. Cambridge, Massachusetts, Harvard University Press; London, William Heinemann Ltd. 1918. Online version at the Perseus Digital Library.
 Tzetzes, John, Chiliades, edited by Gottlieb Kiessling, Leipzig, F. C. G. Vogel, 1826. Google Books.
 Wendel, Carl, Scholia in Apollonium Rhodium vetera'', Hildesheim, Weidmann, 1999. .

Greek dragons
Legendary serpents
Mythical many-headed creatures
Deeds of Zeus
Mythology of Heracles